Julian Penniston-Hill (born 30 June 1970) is a British businessman and entrepreneur, the founder and chief executive of £2bn investment management firm Intelligent Money.

Media
Penniston-Hill has been quoted in the media as a consumer champion, attacking disparities in the financial services industry  and delivering alternatives for investors.  This has resulted in attracting both praise and criticism.

Financial services industry trade paper Money Marketing wrote that Penniston-Hill's company is “taking the moral high ground regarding the way the industry structures its costs”.

Penniston-Hill is quoted in UK newspapers and specialist financial websites. as well as ITN news and the BBC.

Penniston-Hill is also an active user of the website Quora, where he has shared his opinions on American culture and politics, commenting on the USA's "abysmal educational standards leading to widespread stupidity".

Other business activities
In 2016, Penniston-Hill purchased £150m Derbyshire financial advice firms, The Review Business and The Pension Review Business.

References

External links
 IntelligentMoney.com
https://www.pistonheads.com/gassing/topic.asp?h=0&f=206&t=1786977

Living people
1970 births